The 2008 Mexican League season was the 84th season in the history of the Mexican League. It was contested by 16 teams, evenly divided in North and South zones. The season started on 19 March with the match between 2008 season champions Sultanes de Monterrey and Saraperos de Saltillo and ended on 24 August with the last game of the Serie del Rey, where Diablos Rojos del México defeated the Sultanes to win the championship.

899 games were played with a total attendance of 4,035,169 spectators, averaging 4,850 per game.

Standings

Postseason

League leaders

Awards

References

Mexican League season
Mexican League season
Mexican League seasons